Casolari is a surname. Notable people with the surname include:

 Francesco Casolari (born 1965), Italian baseball player
 Georges Casolari (1941–2012), French footballer
 Nardo Casolari (born 1997), Italian rugby union player

See also
Casolani